Abacetus evulsus is a species of ground beetle in the subfamily Pterostichinae. It was described by Peringuey in 1904.

Taxonomy and Phylogeny
The species name evulsus is from Latin meaning 'root out'.

The holotype specimen was collected by Sheppard with the collection date on the 12 July 1903. A paratype was also collected by Sheppard on the 1 July 1903. The South African Museum also holds a further three undesignated specimens.

Species key

Description

Distribution and Habitat
The species was originally collected from Beira in the Sofala province in Mozambique. No other locations are known.

References

Endemic fauna of Mozambique
evulsus
Beetles described in 1904